Tongtian can refer to:

 Tongtian Jiaozhu, in Chinese mythology
 Tongtian River, in China